Tolibjon Sadikov ( – 5 September 1957) was among the founders of professional music in Uzbekistan, as well as the composer of musical dramas, quartets, operas, and romances.

Sadikov was born in Samarkand. From 1924-28, he studied at the Institute of Music and Choreography in Samarkand, where his teachers included leading Uzbek poets and composers, such as Sadriddun Ayni, Sergey Mironov and Viktor Uspensky. He then studied at the Tchaikovsky Conservatory in Moscow from 1934–41, where he graduated as a composer and conductor in the class of Reinhold Glière.

His many honors included the National Artist Award and the State Prize of the USSR. Sadikov also founded the Uzbek Composers Union in 1934 and served as its director for the following 14 years.

In 1939, he wrote the first Uzbek opera, Leili and Mejnun, based on the poem by Alisher Navoi and libretto by Khurshid. The opera was given its first performance by the Alisher Navoi State Academic Bolshoi Theatre of Opera and Ballet in 1940. Among his other operas are Gulsara, Zainab and Omon. His more than 100 songs include Bul-bul (Song-bird), Bakhor (Spring), Sarvi-Gul (Flower), and Johon kurnur (I see such beauty). He also wrote the string quartet Eastern Dances, many film scores (Alisher Navoi, Yigit [Young Man], etc.) and choral works.

References

1907 births
1957 deaths
People from Samarkand
People from Samarkand Oblast
20th-century classical composers
Uzbekistani composers
Soviet composers
Soviet male composers
Male classical composers
Moscow Conservatory alumni
20th-century male musicians